Argostemmateae is a tribe of flowering plants in the family Rubiaceae and contains about 215 species in 4 genera. Its representatives are found in tropical Africa, and tropical and subtropical Asia.

Genera 
Currently accepted names
 Argostemma Wall. (163 sp)
 Mouretia Pit. (4 sp)
 Mycetia Reinw. (45 sp)
 Neohymenopogon Bennet (3 sp)

Synonyms
 Adenosacme Wall. ex G.Don = Mycetia
 Argostemmella Ridl. = Argostemma
 Lawia Wight = Mycetia
 Pomangium Reinw. = Argostemma

References 

 
Rubioideae tribes